David Lee Crow, better known by his stage name Ghastly, is an American DJ and record producer based in Los Angeles, California and originally from Avondale, Arizona. He has released songs on Owsla, Buygore, and Dim Mak, such as "Miami Connection" with Jauz and "Crank It" with Mija and Lil Jon.

Early life 
David Lee Crow was raised on a goat farm with 260 goats and 650 cows in Buckeye, Arizona. He relocated to Venice Beach, California before finding work as resident DJ at Exchange LA. His parents were unable to finance him, leaving him homeless to live in a van before deciding on moving into the city. He would shower at public restrooms and wake up on the beach. He worked for two months at American Apparel who later fired him for being homeless. After moving into an apartment on skid row, he discovered the moniker “Ghastly” and began moving forward with the brand concept. Shortly after being hired and fired from dozens of jobs, he became broke and moved back to the farm in Arizona to save up his finances before again returning to Los Angeles to give a career in electronic music another chance. He found work as a promoter at Exchange LA who later hired him as a resident DJ. Prior to learning and using his first DAWs which were Reason and Ableton, he was one of the two vocalists in the deathcore band The Irish Front.

Career 
In 2012, "Flunky Flex", the first song Crow ever wrote was released on an Owsla compilation album. He then produced an EP for the label but was turned down because it wasn't as 'funky' as his first song. After losing his job and all of his finances he then moved back to the farm to begin again. After seven months of saving up his money he moved back into his van in Los Angeles and started from scratch. At a rave, he met Mija and talked about collaborating before writing the song "Crank It". Mija sent it to Skrillex, the founder of OWSLA. He then invited the pair to join him at the festival Burning Man where they became friends and sealed the deal for Ghastly to release music under his label. From there he began writing music continuously since there was spotlight on him and he took advantage of it. After releasing a slew of originals and remixes he began climbing up the festival bills as well as the charts. He released his debut studio album on May 4, 2018, titled The Mystifying Oracle.

Discography

Studio albums

Extended plays

Singles

Remixes 

 Diplo – "Biggie Bounce" (Ghastly and Mija Mix) (2014)
 The Crystal Method - "Sling The Decks" (Ghastly Remix) (2015)
 GRiZ featuring iDa Hawk - "Stop Trippin'" (Ghastly Remix) (2015)
 Nghtmre and Slander – "Warning" (Ghastly Remix) (2015)
 Snails (DJ) and Herobust - "Pump This" (Ghastly Remix) (2015)
 Zomboy – "Lights Out" (Ghastly Remix) (2017)
 IZII - "Birds" (Ghastly & SWAGE Remix) (2018)
 Latroit and Bishøp - "Loving Every Minute" (Ghastly Remix) (2018)
 Bo Burnham - "All Eyes On Me" (Ghastly Remix) (2021)

References 

American DJs
American electronic musicians
Musicians from Arizona
Living people
1989 births
Owsla artists
Electronic dance music DJs